The Battle of Plovdiv, or Battle of Philippopolis, was one of the final battles of the 1877-1878 Russo-Turkish War. 

Following the crushing Russian victory at the last battle of Shipka Pass, Russian commander Gen. Joseph Vladimirovich Gourko began to move southeast towards Constantinople.  Blocking the route was the Ottoman fortress at Plovdiv under Suleiman Pasha.  On 16 January 1878, a squadron of Russian dragoons led by Captain Alexander Burago stormed the city. Its defenses were strong but superior Russian numbers overwhelmed them and the Ottoman forces retreated almost to Constantinople.  At this time foreign powers intervened and Russia agreed to the Treaty of San Stefano.

Gallery

References

 Compton's Home Library: Battles of the World CD-ROM

 

Plovdiv
Plovdiv 1878
History of Plovdiv

1878 in Bulgaria
Plovdiv 1878
January 1878 events
Plovdiv 1878